Pileh Daraq (also Romanized as Pīleh Daraq; also known as Pīyeh Daraq) is a village in Ojarud-e Sharqi Rural District, Muran District, Germi County, Ardabil Province, Iran. At the 2006 census, its population was 126, in 22 families.

References 

Towns and villages in Germi County